Maoricicada oromelaena, also known as the greater alpine black cicada, is a species of insect that is endemic to New Zealand. This species was first described by John Golding Myers in 1926.

References

Cicadas of New Zealand
Insects described in 1926
Endemic fauna of New Zealand
Cicadettini
Endemic insects of New Zealand